Carlos Arango Medina (Santa Marta, 31 January 1928 - Los Angeles, 19 August 2014) was a Colombian football forward, often known as "El Maestro".

Career
Born in Santa Marta, Arango began his professional football career with Deportes Caldas in 1948, and he would win the league title with Caldas in 1950. He was the only Colombian player in Deportes Samario's first professional squad in 1950. He also played for Atlético Nacional, Santa Fe, Independiente Medellín, Cúcuta Deportivo and Millonarios in Colombia, Monarcas Morelia in Mexico, and La Salle, Vasco and Litoral in Venezuela.

Arango made 22 appearances and scored six goals for the Colombia national football team from 1946 to 1965. He scored Colombia's first goal in FIFA World Cup qualifying, a header against Uruguay in Bogota on 16 June 1957.

Honours
International
Central American and Caribbean Games Gold Medal (1): 1946

References

External links

1928 births
2014 deaths
Colombian footballers
Colombia international footballers
Once Caldas footballers
Atlético Nacional footballers
Independiente Santa Fe footballers
Independiente Medellín footballers
Cúcuta Deportivo footballers
Unión Magdalena footballers
Millonarios F.C. players
Atlético Morelia players
Categoría Primera A players
Liga MX players
Colombian expatriate footballers
Expatriate footballers in Mexico
People from Santa Marta
Central American and Caribbean Games gold medalists for Colombia
Competitors at the 1946 Central American and Caribbean Games
Association football forwards
Central American and Caribbean Games medalists in football
Sportspeople from Magdalena Department
20th-century Colombian people